Margareta Christina Giers (1731 – 12 November 1796) was a Swedish painter.

She was born to vicar Eric Petter Giers and Brita Giring and married to professor Olof Murén. Most of her works are copies in gouache of paintings by the Old Masters.

References
Svenskt konstnärslexikon II, p. 289, Allhems Förlag, Malmö.

1731 births
1796 deaths
Swedish women painters
Rococo painters
Swedish portrait painters
Portrait miniaturists
18th-century Swedish painters
18th-century Swedish women artists